Polygon or Proving ground is a 1977 Soviet animation science fiction short film.

Plot summary
The plot is based on an anti-war military science fiction story by Sever Gansovsky.

In the not-too-distant future a professor from a military great power wants revenge for his son (who was a paratrooper KIA during a war) and thus invents a weapon capable of ending the conflict – an automated mind-reading tank that detects and reacts to human feelings of hostility and fear. After his revenge successfully takes place (as the tank destroys a number of generals responsible for the loss of his son) he himself falls victim to his own creation.

The film has an open ending.

Voice cast
 Vsevolod Yakut
 Oleg Mokshantsev
 Alexander Beliavsky
 Anatoly Kuznetsov
 S. Martynov

Production Information
Polygon was directed by Anatoly Petrov (born 1937) and it was based on a screenplay by Sever Gansovsky (edited by Arcady Snessarev). The short film was produced by Lubov' Butyrina and released by Soyuzmultfilm studio. It featured the artwork of artists Elena Karavaeva, Olga Bogolubova, I. Kulakova, Elena Bogolubova and N. Ivancheva. The art director was Galina Barinova.

The animator was Vladimir Zarubin under the supervision of Anatoly Petrov. It was filmed by cameraman Michael Druyan and the sound effects and music were created by Vladimir Kutuzov.

Animation Technique
The film was drawn in an unusual animation technique called photographica that consists of two celluloid layers for each character with special color schemes and with one of the layers out of focus to imitate the three-dimensional space rendering. The animation then actively moves the virtual camera to change perspective dynamically for each scene and give a sense of realism, without the use of any CGI methods (which were not available at the time).

The characters in this animated film were designed with faces very similar to those of several famous movie actors and celebrities of the time, including Ringo Starr, Jean Gabin, Paul Newman, Yul Brynner and Mel Ferrer (The professor) among others.

Music
The French orchestra leader Paul Mauriat provided the theme music for the film which is an instrumental arrangement version of the "El Bimbo" originally made by the French euro disco group Bimbo Jet led by Claude Morgan and Laurent Rossi.

Awards
The film won the following awards:
 First Prize at the Yerevan Film Festival (USSR, 1978).
 Official Selection at the Oberhausen Film Festival (Germany, 1979).

External links
 
  (English subtitles)
 Polygon at Animator.ru
 
 
 

1977 films
Anti-war films
Soviet animated films
Russian animated short films
Russian and Soviet animated science fiction films
Soyuzmultfilm
Films based on Russian novels
1970s political films
1970s war films